Gradišče na Kozjaku is a dispersed settlement in the Municipality of Selnica ob Dravi in Slovenia, right on the border with Austria.

Name
The name of the settlement was changed from Gradišče to Gradišče na Kozjaku in 1953.

References

External links
Gradišče na Kozjaku on Geopedia

Populated places in the Municipality of Selnica ob Dravi